William J. Woodford (1858 – 1944) was a politician in Newfoundland. He represented Harbour Main in the Newfoundland House of Assembly from 1889 to 1900 and from 1908 to 1928.

The son of William Woodford, a sealing captain, and Sarah Cole, he was born in St. John's and was educated at Saint Bonaventure's College. Woodford married Minnie Whidden. He took up the trades of carpentry and plasterwork. Woodford also managed real estate holdings acquired by his father.

He was named to the Executive Council as Financial Secretary in 1894. Originally a Liberal, he became a Conservative in 1897 and was named to the cabinet as Minister of Public Works. However, in 1900, he supported a vote of no confidence which brought down the government. Woodford returned to the assembly in 1908 as a member of the Newfoundland People's Party. He served in the cabinet again as Minister of Public Works and later as Minister of Posts and Telegraphs. Woodford retired from politics in 1928.

After he left the assembly, he served as Supervisor of Lighthouses for a year.

References 

Members of the Executive Council of Newfoundland and Labrador
1858 births
1944 deaths